WHAG is an oldies formatted broadcast radio station licensed to Halfway, Maryland, serving Hagerstown, Maryland and Washington County, Maryland.  WHAG is owned and operated by Alpha Media.  WHAG simulcasts sister AM station WCHA.

References

External links
Oldies 96.3 Online

HAG
Alpha Media radio stations